United Nations Security Council resolution 668, adopted unanimously on 20 September 1990, after noting the ongoing political discussions and efforts regarding a just and lasting peaceful situation in Cambodia, the council endorsed the political framework that would enable the Cambodian people to exercise their right to self-determination through U.N. organised elections.

The council had been considering the question of Cambodia and the occupation of the country by Vietnamese troops for almost a decade, however, the council could not act due to lack of agreement amongst its permanent members. Instead, it was addressed by the General Assembly. After the fall of the Khmer Rouge in 1979, Vietnam installed a puppet government, which was opposed by several groups in the country, including the United National Front for an Independent, Neutral, Peaceful and Cooperative Cambodia, Khmer People's Liberation Front and the Party of Democratic Kampuchea, but supported by both Vietnam and the Soviet Union. Representatives from each party gathered for the Paris Conference in 1989, but an agreement was not reached.

After the Fall of Nations, the September 1990 Sino-Vietnamese  favored the Beijing-proposed 13 members dialogue instead of the Hanoi-proposed 12 members dialogue solution. Following discussions in Indonesia and Japan in October 1990, the parties agreed a plan in which they would be guided by certain principles in order to solve the Cambodian problem. The Security Council, in Resolution 668, acknowledged and welcomed the agreement.

The resolution went on to welcome the creation of a Supreme National Council as a source of authority throughout the transitional period. It also requested other countries and the Secretary-General to continue to assist in the peace settlement. A move in the General Assembly to endorse the peace process was also approved in Resolution 45/3 on 15 October 1990.

See also
 List of United Nations Security Council Resolutions 601 to 700 (1987–1991)
 Modern Cambodia
 Resolutions 717 (1991), 718 (1991)
 Transition of the People's Republic of Kampuchea to Cambodia
 United Nations Transitional Authority in Cambodia

References

External links
 
Text of the Resolution at undocs.org

 0668
20th century in Cambodia
Political history of Cambodia
 0668
Cambodia–Vietnam relations
September 1990 events
1990 in Cambodia